Adam Kaminski (born May 27, 1984) is a Canadian volleyball player, a member of the Canada men's national volleyball team.

Sporting achievements

Clubs 
Canada West Mens Volleyball:
  2005, 2006, 2008
  2004
U Sports Championship:
  2005, 2008
  2004, 2006, 2007
Slovenian Championship:
  2009, 2010
Czech Cup:
  2013
Czech Championship:
  2013

National Team 
Pan-American Cup:
  2008
  2011

References

External links
Volleybox profile
FIVB profile
CEV profile

1984 births
Living people
Canadian men's volleyball players
Sportspeople from Chatham, Kent
Canadian people of Polish descent
Canadian expatriate sportspeople in Poland
Expatriate volleyball players in Poland
Canadian expatriate sportspeople in the Czech Republic
Expatriate volleyball players in the Czech Republic
Canadian expatriate sportspeople in Slovenia
Expatriate volleyball players in Slovenia
Fellows of the American Physical Society